Hardisty is a town in Flagstaff County in east-central Alberta, Canada. Hardisty is mainly known as a pivotal petroleum industry hub where petroleum products such as Western Canada Select blended crude oil and Hardisty heavy oil are produced and traded.

History 
The Town of Hardisty was named after Senator Richard Hardisty. It began in 1906 as a hamlet, and officially became a town in 1911.

The first people known to have lived in the Battle River Valley were the native First Nations. This country was the wintering grounds for thousands of buffalo, moose, elk and deer, which attracted these people to the area.

The Town of Hardisty owes its existence to the Canadian Pacific Railway. About 1904 the surveyors began to survey the railroad from the east and decided to locate a divisional point at Hardisty because of the good water supply from the nearby Battle River.

Although this was a trading centre as early as 1904, it became a boom town by 1906, spawned by the influx of workers who were building the CPR. By the fall of 1906 the rail line reached Hardisty from Daysland. Then began the task of building the bridge, a task which took about three years.

Settlers also began arriving in large numbers. During 1906 to 1907, Hardisty was referred to as a tent town because people lived in tents until lumber could be hauled in. Business places sprang up overnight and, as with many towns, they were built along the railroad track.

Demographics 

In the 2016 Census of Population conducted by Statistics Canada, the Town of Hardisty recorded a population of 554 living in 254 of its 401 total private dwellings, a  change from its 2011 population of 639.

Economy 
The main industries in and around Hardisty are petroleum and farming. There is a large petroleum "tank farm" near Hardisty, which is also a nexus of oil pipelines. The oil industry in Hardisty focuses primarily on transport rather than oil processing or collection. Some of the petroleum companies are: Gibson Energy, Enbridge, TC Energy, and many others.

Hardisty is the start of the proposed Keystone XL Pipeline, which is intended to transport synthetic crude oil, blended crude oil from the Athabasca oil sands to refineries in the United States.

Attractions 
Hardisty Lake Park is located within the town limits and has camping, swimming, boating, trout fishing, golfing, baseball diamonds, rodeos and sporting events. Hardisty also has a soccer field, a curling rink, a hockey rink, and cross-country skiing. The Hardisty area is also known for upland game, geese, duck, mule deer and whitetail deer hunting.

Education 
Hardisty's school is named Allan Johnstone School, and teaches kindergarten and Grades 1 to 9. This school was shut down in 2020 with students now needing to attend schools in neighbouring areas. High school students (Grades 10 to 12), are taken by bus to Sedgewick. There is also a playschool in Hardisty.

Television 
Paperny Films taped the reality television show The Week The Women Went in Hardisty from June 2 to June 9, 2007.  It aired on CBC in Canada for eight consecutive weeks starting January 21, 2008. The show explored what happens when all the women in an ordinary Canadian town disappear for a week and leave the men and children to cope on their own.

See also 
 List of communities in Alberta
 List of towns in Alberta
 Hardisty Airport
 List of oil pipelines

References

External links 

1906 establishments in Alberta
Flagstaff County
Towns in Alberta